The 1991 Atlantic Coast Conference men's basketball tournament took place in Charlotte, North Carolina, at the second Charlotte Coliseum. North Carolina won the tournament, defeating Duke, 96–74, in the championship game. Rick Fox of North Carolina was named tournament MVP.

 did not participate in the tournament because the program was on probation. Top seed Duke received a first-round bye into the semifinals.

Bracket

AP rankings at time of tournament

External links
 

Tournament
ACC men's basketball tournament
College sports in North Carolina
Basketball competitions in Charlotte, North Carolina
ACC men's basketball tournament
ACC men's basketball tournament